Sposobny (lit. "capable"; alternate spellings Sposobnyy, and Sposobnyi) can refer to a number of Soviet warships:

 , a Soviet Navy 
 , a Soviet Navy 
 , a Soviet Navy 

Soviet Navy ship names